Elections to the Adur District Council were held on 6 May 1982, with one third of the council up for election. There was additional vacancies in the Mash Barn and Peverel wards, but no elections for the single-member ward St Marys and Residents stronghold, Marine, went uncontested. In the intervening years, the newly formed Alliance had gained three seats at the expense of the Conservatives. Overall turnout fell to 42.4%.

The election resulted in the SDP-Liberal Alliance retaining control of the council.

Election result

This resulted in the following composition of the council:

Ward results

+/- figures represent changes from the last time these wards were contested.

References

1982
1982 English local elections
1980s in West Sussex